The Republic of Ireland (Ireland) has been visited by a Pope twice:
Pope John Paul II's visit to Ireland, 1979
Pope Francis's visit to Ireland, 2018